Oaksey is a village and civil parish in Wiltshire, England, on the county boundary with Gloucestershire.

The Swill Brook forms part of the northern boundary of the parish.

History
A settlement of 28 households at Wochesie was recorded in Domesday Book of 1086. There was a church at Oaksey in the 12th century, and in 1377 there were 86 poll tax payers.

It may be the remains of a Norman motte-and-bailey castle.

An early manor house, near the church, was in ruins by 1593. Oaksey Park House, a three-storey manor house, was built in the early 17th century, possibly for Sir Henry Poole. It was demolished in 1956.

Parish church

The Grade I listed Church of England parish church of All Saints existed by the first half of the 12th century, and the nave walls of the current building may date from that time. In the 13th century the chancel was rebuilt and the three-bay south aisle was added, along with the south porch. The Decorated Gothic north porch was added in the first half of the 14th century. The five-bay Perpendicular Gothic clerestory was added in the first half of the 15th century. Further Perpendicular Gothic additions were made early in the 16th century: the south aisle was extended to form the south chapel, new windows were inserted in the north wall of the nave, the third stage of the tower was added.

A number of wall paintings were painted in the church either in the 15th century or early in the 16th century. Those that survive today include a painting of Saint Christopher with a mermaid, one of Christ surrounded by instruments of torture as a warning to Sabbath breakers and a badly damaged one of Saint Edmund.

In 1553 the tower had three bells, one of which had been cast at Worcester. In 1773 these were replaced by a ring of six new bells cast by Thomas Rudhall of Gloucester. In 1960 the ring was recast by John Taylor & Co of Loughborough.

Amenities
Oaksey has a pub, the Wheatsheaf Inn. A village hall was opened in 2000. Oaksey has primary school, a shop and Post Office, a cricket club, a football club which plays in the Cirencester and District League and a branch of the Women's Institute.

Oaksey Park Airfield (ICAO code EGTW) has two grass runways and is operated by Austen Aviation Services.

The Cotswold Water Park extends into the eastern part of the parish.

Railway
The Golden Valley Line between Swindon and Cheltenham was built across the parish in 1841. Between 1929 and 1964 there was a small station (Oaksey Halt) where the road to Somerford Keynes crossed the line. The nearest station is Kemble, about 3 miles distance by road.

References

Sources and further reading

External links

Villages in Wiltshire
Civil parishes in Wiltshire